The 2021 Women's Euro Winners Cup was the sixth edition of the Women's Euro Winners Cup (WEWC), an annual continental beach soccer tournament for women's top-division European clubs. The championship is the sport's version of the UEFA Women's Champions League in association football.

Organised by Beach Soccer Worldwide (BSWW), the tournament was held in Nazaré, Portugal, in tandem with the larger men's edition, from 12–18 July.

The event began with a round robin group stage. At its conclusion, the best teams progressed to the knockout stage, a series of single elimination games to determine the winners, starting with the semi-finals and ending with the final. Consolation matches were also played to determine other final rankings.

Mriya 2006 of Ukraine were the defending champions, but were eliminated at the group stage. The title was won by Madrid CFF, who claimed their first title in their second appearance in the final.

Teams

Qualification
Usually, to enter, a club needed to be the champions of their country's most recent national championship. If a national association wished to enter more than one club, they can request for permission to do so from the organisers BSWW who would grant or reject the clubs a berth at the tournament depending on the total number of teams already registered.

But as like last year, due to the effect of the COVID-19 pandemic on the competition, the normal rules regarding qualification were abandoned; entry restrictions were relaxed: the event was opened up to simply any European club that wished to participate.

Entrants
18 clubs from eight different nations entered the event.

Key: H: Hosts \ TH: Title holders

Draw
The draw to split the 18 clubs into three groups of six took place at 13:00 CEST (UTC+2) on 7 July at BSWW's headquarters in Barcelona, Spain.

Group stage
The winners of each group, and the best second-placed team, advanced to the semi-finals.

All kickoff times are local, WEST (UTC+1) and were those scheduled; actual times may have differed slightly.

Group A

Group B

Group C

Ranking of second-placed teams
Since Groups B consisted of five teams, for the second placed teams from Groups A and C, their results against the teams finishing in sixth place in their groups were discounted for this ranking.

Placement matches

Thirteenth place match

9th–12th place play-offs

Semi-finals

Eleventh place match

Ninth place match

5th–8th place play-offs

Semi-finals

Seventh place match

Fifth place match

Knockout stage

Semi-finals

Third place match

Final

Awards
The following individual awards were presented after the final.

Top goalscorers
Players who scored at least four goals are listed

14 goals
 Alba Mellado ( Madrid)

13 goals
 Molly Clark ( Higicontrol Melilla)

11 goals
 Natalia Gomez ( Lokrians)

10 goals
 Maria Soto ( Higicontrol Melilla)

9 goals

 Adriana Manau ( Bonaire Terrassa)
 Anna Cherniakova ( Zvezda)

8 goals

 Kseniia Hrytsenko ( Domino's)
 Lorena Medeiros ( Marseille BT)

7 goals

 Anaëlle Wiard ( Newteam Brussels)
 Erika Ferrara ( Lokrians)

6 goals

 Joana Carvalho ( Pastéis)
 Anna Shulha ( Domino's)
 Ali Hall ( Newteam Brainois)
 Carmen Fresneda ( San Javier)

5 goals

 Marianna Kramna ( Domino's)
 Laurine Herbster ( Newteam Brainois)
 Adriele Rocha ( Marseille BT)
 Maria Barquero ( Cáceres)
 Federica Dall'ara ( Lokrians)
 Nataliia Kanaeva ( Zvezda)
 Anna Akylbaeva ( Zvezda)

4 goals

 Wendy Martin ( Roquetas 2018)
 Laura Chamizo ( Bonaire Terrassa)
 Julia Serrat ( Bonaire Terrassa)
 Iryna Vasyliuk ( Domino's)
 Julie Bernard ( Marseille BT)
 Yuliia Kostiuk ( Mriya 2006)
 Katie James ( San Javier)
 Andrea Miron ( San Javier)
 Carolina González ( San Javier)
 Letícia Villar ( Lokrians)
 Iana Zubilova ( Zvezda)

Source: BSWW

Final standings

References

External links 
Women's Euro Winners Cup 2021, at Beach Soccer Worldwide
Women's Euro Winners Cup 2021, at ZeroZero.pt (in Portuguese)
Women's Euro Winners Cup 2021, at BS Russia (in Russian)

Women's Euro Winners Cup
2021 in beach soccer
Euro
2021
Nazaré, Portugal
Euro Winners Cup